Tanya Gilly Khailany (born in Iraqi-Kurdistan) is an activist and former member of the Iraqi Parliament from 2006 – 2010. She is the co-founder of the SEED Foundation, an organization that works with violence and trafficking survivors in Iraq and in the region. She was one of the main parliamentarians who pushed for the legislation of 25 per cent quota for women in Iraqi provincial councils and advocated for equal opportunities for women.

References

External links 
 C-Span

Kurdish politicians
21st-century Kurdish women politicians
Year of birth missing (living people)
Living people
Iraqi activists
Iraqi women activists
Kurdish activists
Kurdish women activists
Women's rights in Kurdistan